Grace Dieu was the flagship of King Henry V of England and one of the largest ships of her time.  Launched in 1418, she sailed on only one voyage and was subsequently laid up at anchor in the River Hamble. She burned in 1439 after being struck by lightning. The wreck is a Protected Wreck managed by Historic England.

Design and construction
Grace Dieu was built to a design proposed by William Soper, a burgess of Southampton and Clerk of the King's Ships. She was clinker-built with three planks nailed together along each part of her hull and waterproofed with tar and moss sandwiched between the timbers. Estimates of her weight range between 1,400 tons and 2,750 tons. Two smaller ships, Valentine and Falcon, were built to escort her. A dock was specially built for her construction near Town Quay in Southampton.

The remains of Grace Dieu suggest that she was built in a hurry, with some of the planks and ribs left only roughly finished. She was a vast ship requiring 2,735 oak, 1,145 beech, and 14 ash trees for her timbers. When completed in 1418, she was one of the largest wooden ships of her time. Humphrey, Duke of Gloucester, regarded her as "the fairest [vessel] that ever man saw," while the Florentine Captain of the Galleys, Luca di Masa degli Albizzi, remarked that despite his lifetime at sea he had never seen "so large and beautiful a construction".

Grace Dieu was designed for use in battle against Genoas formidable fleet of carracks, that city being at the time the ally of France and enemy of England. However, by the time she was completed England had firm control over the Channel and was at peace with France following the Treaty of Troyes.

1420 voyage
Grace Dieu and her escorts appear to have only set sail once, in 1420, under the command of the Earl of Devon and with orders to make a cruise down the English Channel. The expedition suffered a mutiny even before leaving port, when the crew objected to the presence of a contingent of soldiers and archers brought aboard to guard the vessel. Grace Dieus sailors attempted to prevent the soldiers from boarding by abusing the clerk who was registering their names and threatening to throw the register itself into the sea. When the ship finally left port, nine of the crew incited a further mutiny against the captain by refusing to take their stations and insisting that the cruise be abandoned. Grace Dieu was brought into the nearest port, St. Helen's on the Isle of Wight, and the crew departed. A clerk who questioned their loyalty as they departed was assaulted and had his clothing torn.

Service after Henry V's death and loss
When Henry V died in 1422 his ships were treated as his private property rather than as part of the kingdom's navy. Many were sold off to pay his debts.

In 1430 William Soper, by now in charge of the administration of the entire navy, dined with the commander of the Florentine merchant fleet on board Grace Dieu.

Subsequently, Grace Dieu was laid-up in the River Hamble. Already dismasted and stripped of equipment, she was burnt to the waterline after being set ablaze by a bolt of lightning in 1439.

Rediscovery
The remains of Grace Dieu are still in the River Hamble at Bursledon, near Southampton, Hampshire. Until 1933 the wreck was believed to be that of a Danish galley or a nineteenth-century merchant ship, but in that year a proper survey established both the true identity of the wreck, and the great size of the ship. The site was designated under the Protection of Wrecks Act on 5 February 1974 and was excavated by Channel 4's archaeology programme Time Team in 2004 for the 2005 series. 50 metres from the remains lie those of another vessel, believed to be Grace Dieu'''s contemporary Holigost.

 See also 
List of world's largest wooden shipsGreat Harry — Henry VIII's flagship 1514; The Henry Grace à Dieu ("Henry Grace of God").
Peter von Danzig
Jong (ship)
Baochuan

References

External links
Time Team excavation site Archived 15 February 2005, retrieved 26 January 2021.
Aerial view of excavation site.
"Grace Dieu and the possible site of the Holigost" National Heritage List for England

Bibliography

R C Anderson, The Bursledon Ship, Mariner's Mirror, Vol 20, No.2, 1934.
M W Prynne, Henry V's Grace Dieu, Mariner's Mirror, Vol 54, No.2, 1968.
N A M Rodger, The Safeguard of the Sea, A Naval History of Britain 660-1649 (London 1997).
S Rose, Henry V's Grace Dieu and Mutiny at Sea: Some new evidence'', Mariner's Mirror, Vol 63, No.1, 1977.
B Wilson, Empire of the Deep; The Rise and Fall of the British Navy, Weidenfeld & Nicolson, 2013

Ships of the English navy
Individual sailing vessels
Protected Wrecks of England
Shipwrecks in rivers
Ships built in Southampton
15th-century ships
History of Hampshire
1418 in England
1439 in England